Latice Crawford (born July 22, 1982 as Latice Tenae Crawford) is an American urban contemporary gospel singer, composer, and actress. She is best known for using her three-octave, contralto vocal range of to finish third on the second season of the competitive gospel singing television show Sunday Best on Black Entertainment Television. Her self-titled debut album reached two Billboard charts, the Top Gospel Albums and the Top Heatseekers. Her second album, Diary of a Church Girl, also appeared on the Top Gospel Albums chart.

Early life
Crawford was born in Manhattan, New York,. Growing up as the middle sister of three, Crawford sang in children's choirs and eventually rose to become a soloist and worship leader. This led to her serving in recording sessions, doing vocal references and singing background for established artists.

Music career
Crawford first gained fame during her performances on Sunday Best, where she finished in third place.

Over the course of the series, Crawford gave well-received renditions of "Reach Out And Touch Somebody's Hand" and "Peace Be Still." Since the show, Crawford has starred in a reality series and released two studio albums.

Her first studio album, Latice Crawford, was released by RCA Inspiration in 2014,. Her sophomore release, Diary of a Church Girl, is a five-song EP. It features the songs "Author" and "Choose Me", which both made it to Billboard's Top Gospel Airplay and Hot Gospel Songs Charts.  The EP also garnered Crawford her first Stellar Award Nomination for Contemporary Female Vocalist of the Year.

Discography

Studio albums

Personal life
Latice resides in East Stroudsburg, Pennsylvania.

References

External links
Official website

1982 births
Living people
African-American  songwriters
African-American Christians
Musicians from New York City
Songwriters from New York (state)
Songwriters from Pennsylvania
RCA Records artists
Urban contemporary gospel musicians
21st-century African-American  women singers